Mount Andrus is a shield volcano 3.2 km (2 mi) SE of Mount Boennighausen in the SE extremity of Ames Range, in Marie Byrd Land, Antarctica. Mapped by USGS from surveys and U.S. Navy air photos, 1964–68. Named by US-ACAN for Lt. Carl H. Andrus, US Navy, medical officer and Officer-in-Charge of Byrd Station in 1964.

Andrus has a 4.5 km-wide caldera at its summit. The westward face of the mountain is drained by the Coleman Glacier, with significant crevassing present. While the age of Mt. Andrus is not well known it is one of the oldest trachytic shield volcanoes in Marie Byrd Land, similar in age to Mount Hampton.

See also
List of volcanoes in Antarctica

References

External links 
 https://web.archive.org/web/20051030114935/http://usarc.usgs.gov/antarctic_atlas/
 http://www.skimountaineer.com/

Polygenetic shield volcanoes
Calderas of Antarctica
Volcanoes of Marie Byrd Land
Ames Range
Miocene shield volcanoes